Bettauer is a German language habitational surname. Notable people with the name include:
 Hugo Bettauer (1872–1925), Austrian writer and journalist
 James Bettauer (1991), Canadian-German professional ice hockey player
 Margot Bettauer Dembo (1928–2019), German-born American translator of fiction and non-fiction
 Robert Bettauer (1956), Canadian tennis broadcaster and former professional player

References 

German-language surnames
German toponymic surnames